The Katuna–Muko Road is a road in the Western Region of Uganda, connecting the town of Katuna to the town of Muko, both in Kabale District.

Location

From there, the road takes a general north-westerly direction, looping around the southern shores of Lake Bunyonyi. It passes between the Rwandan border to the west and the western shores of the lake to the east.

The road then continues northwards for another , to end at Muko, on the Kabale–Kisoro–Bunagana Road.

Overview
This road is of importance to Uganda for two reasons. Lake Bunyonyi is increasingly becoming attractive to tourists, some of whom may come in from Rwanda, by road. Secondly, increased tourism demands increased services, leading to improved standards of living for those who provide those services. Improved transportation for the residents will enable them to benefit from the increased economic activity around the lake.

Upgrading to bitumen
In February 2019, David Bahati, the junior minister for economic planning, who also doubles as the area member of parliament, announced that the government of Uganda had officially approached the African Development Bank and the Exim Bank of China to request a loan of US$96 million to upgrade this road to class II bitumen. The road is still in the planning stage.

See also
 Economy of Uganda
 Transport in Uganda
 List of roads in Uganda

References

External links
 Uganda National Road Authority Homepage

Roads in Uganda
Geography of Uganda
Transport in Uganda
Kabale District
Western Region, Uganda